Fort Lauderdale station is an inter-city rail station located in Fort Lauderdale, Florida. It is served by Brightline, which connects Miami, Aventura, Boca Raton, West Palm Beach, and eventually Orlando International Airport. The station is located in downtown Fort Lauderdale, on NW 2nd Avenue between Broward Boulevard and NW 4th Street, adjacent to the Broward County Transit's Central Terminal. The station is also served by Sun Trolley.

History
Construction for the station began October 2014 with the demolition of existing structures on the site. The station is a modern style structure with illuminated V-shaped columns supporting the upper concourse, echoing the designs of the Miami and West Palm Beach stations on the line. It was planned and designed by Skidmore, Owings & Merrill in association with Zyscovich Architects, and was completed in January 2018.

References

External links

Fort Lauderdale station Brightline

Brightline stations
Passenger rail transportation in Florida
Florida East Coast Railway
Railway stations in the United States opened in 2018
Transportation buildings and structures in Broward County, Florida
2018 establishments in Florida
Economy of Fort Lauderdale, Florida
Skidmore, Owings & Merrill buildings